United Nations Security Council resolution 941, adopted unanimously on 23 September 1994, after reaffirming all resolutions on the situation in Bosnia and Herzegovina, the Council discussed violations of international humanitarian law in Banja Luka, Bijeljina and other areas of the country.

The security council had received information from the International Committee of the Red Cross and United Nations High Commissioner for Refugees about serious violations of international humanitarian law against the non-Serb population in areas in Bosnia and Herzegovina under Bosnian Serb control. It expressed concern at the "persistent and systematic campaign of terror" and ethnic cleansing perpetrated in Banja Luka, Bijeljina and other areas, as well as the Bosnian Serb refusal to allow the Special Representative of the Secretary-General and the United Nations Protection Force (UNPROFOR) into the areas. It was recognised that the International Criminal Tribunal for the former Yugoslavia (ICTY) had jurisdiction in this area and was determined to put an end to the ethnic cleansing.

Acting under Chapter VII of the United Nations Charter, the council reminded all parties in the conflict were bound by international humanitarian law and specifically the Geneva Conventions of 1949. All violations of these rights, and ethnic cleansing in particular, were strongly condemned. It also reaffirmed that all statements and actions made under duress, especially with regard to territory were null and void and that all displaced persons should be able to return to their homes.

The resolution demanded that the Bosnian Serbs immediately cease their campaign of ethnic cleansing and that they gave the United Nations access to the areas concerned. The Secretary-General Boutros Boutros-Ghali was urged to ensure that UNPROFOR was deployed to the areas of concern as soon as possible. He was further requested to report on the implementation of the current resolution as soon as possible.

See also
 Bosnian Genocide
 Bosnian War
 Breakup of Yugoslavia
 Croatian War of Independence
 List of United Nations Security Council Resolutions 901 to 1000 (1994–1995)
 Yugoslav Wars

References

External links
 
Text of the Resolution at undocs.org

 0941
 0941
1994 in Yugoslavia
1994 in Bosnia and Herzegovina
 0941
September 1994 events